Creede Repertory Theatre (CRT or Creede Rep) is a summer theatre that operates from early May through mid-September. Founded in 1966, CRT is a professional theatre company located at 9,000 feet of elevation in the historic town of Creede, CO, which offers mountain views, hiking trails and campsites in a county which is 97 percent public land.

In addition to creating live theatre, Creede Rep champions several nationally known educational programs. CRT offers a variety of educational summer and Friday day camps, the KID's Show program, and the Young Audience Outreach Tour [YAOT].  

Since 2003, as part of CRT’s annual summer season, a professional team of theatre artists mentor local students (ages 10+) through the process of creating a fully produced, all-original show. KID's Show employs an in-depth mentorship model. Each year, approximately 15-20 young people work alongside a team of teaching artists and professional theatre makers to bring a brand-new production to life in just under three weeks.

The Young Audience Outreach Tour’s mission is to bring high quality musical theatre to rural and underserved communitie's. This program annually produces an original children’s show for student's in grades K-6 grade that tours throughout the Southwest, serving over 31,000 young people.

History
The Creede Repertory Theatre (CRT) was founded in 1966 when 12 students from the University of Kansas came to Creede, Colorado, responding to a letter drafted by the Creede Junior Chamber of Commerce and Pastor Jim Livingston. The letter was a call for help. With the mining business declining in Creede, the town needed a new source of viable income to help sustain the smaller businesses and its year-round residents. Steve Grossman, a theatre student at KU, was the only one who responded to the letter. He and fellow student Joe Roach took a road trip to Creede in the spring of 1966 and sealed the deal with a handshake. Grossman then took 11 students with him and together they launched the first of many summer theatre seasons in Creede. Originally called Operation Summer Theatre, the name was officially changed to Creede Repertory Theatre in 1968. The first season began with the opening of Mr. Roberts and continued with the showing of The Bat, Our Town, The Rainmaker, and Born Yesterday. The shows were run in repertory format which allowed patrons to see a new play each night of the week.

The theatre today
The theatre continues to operate on the principles established by Grossman and the KU theatre students. CRT maintains a rigorous repertory schedule, continues to employ an ensemble cast and crew, and chooses a diverse selection of plays. In 2005, USA Today ranked CRT as one of the “10 great places to see lights way off Broadway.”  The 2006 company received 11 Ovation nominations from the  Denver Post. In 2007, CRT was awarded the National Theatre Conference's Award of Outstanding Achievement. Presently, CRT is the largest summer employer in all of Mineral County.

2022 season 

 Steel Magnolias by Robert Harling, May 28-Sept 17
 Always...Patsy Cline created & originally directed by Ted Swindley. Based on a true story May 29-Sept 17
 Native Gardens by Karen Zacarías. June 18-Sept 11
 Ken Ludwig's Sherwood: The Adventures of Robin Hood, June 25-Sept 10
 Boomtown! Improv Comedy, July 1-Sept 9
 The KID Show: Music Box by Allison Quiller, July 8-10
 Young Audience Outreach Tour: Casa Alfonsa with book and lyrics by Diana Grisanti, music by Emiliano Messiez

2012 season 
 The Drowsy Chaperone
 Mrs. Mannerly
 Presidents!
 Is He Dead?
 Ghost Writer
 Harry the Great
 Boomtown

2011 season 
 I Capture the Castle
 How to Succeed in Business without Really Trying
 Unnecessary Farce
 The Road to Mecca
 The Bad Man
 The Mystery of Irma Vep
 Boomtown

2010 season
 The 25th Annual Putnam County Spelling Bee, June 4-August 21
 The 39 Steps, June 18-September 25
 The Ladies Man, June 25-August 28
 This Day and Age, July 23-September 24
 The Joy of Going Somewhere Definite, August 20-September 25
 Zeus on the Loose, May 29-August 7
 Boomtown, July 2-August 21

References

External links
Official website

Theatre companies in Colorado
Theatre in Colorado
Tourist attractions in Mineral County, Colorado